Dagenham & Redbridge Football Club  is a professional association football club based in Dagenham, Greater London, England. The team competes in the National League, the fifth tier of the English football league system. Often known simply as Dagenham and abbreviated when written to Dag & Red, they are nicknamed the Daggers. They play their home games at Victoria Road.

The club was formed in 1992 through a merger of Dagenham and Redbridge Forest, the latter merged from Ilford, Leytonstone and Walthamstow Avenue. The club's traditional colours are red and blue, to represent the merged teams. The club replaced Redbridge Forest in the Football Conference but were relegated in 1996. They won the Isthmian League title in 1999–2000 and qualified for the next three Conference play-offs, missing out on the 2001–02 title on goal difference and losing the 2003 Conference play-off final. They secured promotion into the Football League after winning the Conference title in the 2006–07 season. They then moved up from League Two after winning the 2010 play-off final, though were relegated the next season after finishing 21st in League One. Dagenham were relegated back into non-League football in 2016.

History

Formation
Dagenham & Redbridge F.C. was formed in 1992 following a merger between two clubs – Dagenham and Redbridge Forest. Both clubs had fallen on hard times due to dwindling attendances. The club can trace back its ancestry to 1881 as Redbridge Forest was an amalgamation of three of the amateur game's most famous clubs, Ilford, Leytonstone and Walthamstow Avenue. Between the clubs they won the FA Trophy once, FA Amateur Cup seven times, Isthmian League 20 times, Athenian League six times, Essex Senior Cup 26 times and London Senior Cup 23 times.

Non-League
Dagenham & Redbridge spent its inaugural season in the Football Conference taking the place of Redbridge Forest. The club's first fixture in its new guise was on 25 July 1992, an 8–0 thrashing of Great Wakering Rovers in a friendly. The first competitive result was a 2–0 win over Merthyr Tydfil in the Conference.

Dagenham & Redbridge spent several seasons in the Football Conference but was relegated to the Isthmian League Premier Division in 1996. The club remained in that division until winning promotion in 1999–2000, going on to establish itself as one of the strongest clubs in the Conference, finishing third, second and fifth in its first three seasons back following promotion.

The club was narrowly beaten to the Conference title by Boston United in 2002 on goal difference. Boston United was subsequently found guilty of inappropriately making illegal payments to its players in its title-winning season. Dagenham & Redbridge attempted unsuccessfully to have itself declared Conference Champions, and therefore take Boston's contentious place in The Football League. A four-point deduction was put in place against Boston United for the following season but not for the season in which the irregularities had been committed.

The Daggers then declined somewhat, finishing the 2003–04, 2004–05 and 2005–06 seasons in mid-table. On 27 February 2004 the club were hammered 9–0 at home by Hereford United, equalling the record highest winning margin in the Conference.

Promotion to the Football League
The 2006–07 season saw Dagenham & Redbridge battle it out with Oxford United for the top of the league spot. Despite Oxford quickly racing to the top, a collapse in Oxford's form combined with an excellent run for the Daggers saw them overtake Oxford in the league. On 7 April, Dagenham & Redbridge beat Aldershot Town 2–1 to build an unbeatable lead in the league, becoming Conference Champions, meaning the club would play in the Football League for the first time in its history.

Dagenham & Redbridge played its first match in The Football League on 11 August 2007, a 1–0 defeat to Stockport County. The club won its first Football League game at home to Lincoln City on 1 September 2007. The Daggers finished the season in 20th place, ensuring a second season of Football League competition. Promotion to the Football League meant that Dagenham & Redbridge could compete in the League Cup for the first time. The club lost in the first round to Luton Town.

The following season, the Daggers reached their highest ever position of eighth. They just failed to make the League Two play-offs after losing to Shropshire side Shrewsbury Town at home on the last day of the season.

Promotion to League One
The 2009–10 season saw The Daggers promoted for the first time in their history from League Two to League One. They achieved this by beating Rotherham United in a dramatic 3–2 playoff final at Wembley on 30 May 2010. Twice the Daggers took the lead, only to concede moments later. Jon Nurse regained the advantage for Dagenham & Redbridge, scoring a scrappy 70th-minute winner.

The Daggers first game in League One of the 2010–2011 season was a 2–0 defeat to Sheffield Wednesday on 7 August 2010. After one more defeat against Notts County, the team got their first point, as they drew 2–2 with Tranmere Rovers and their first win of the League One season just a week later as they beat Leyton Orient 2–0 with both goals coming from Romain Vincelot. It was an unsuccessful season in League One as they finished 21st and were relegated on the last day of the 2010–2011 season back to League Two.

Relegation back into League Two
Following relegation the previous season back into League Two, the Daggers started the 2011–2012 season with a 1–0 win against Macclesfield Town. Following this the team lost only once in the month of August; however, this run of good results was going to end as from 3 September to 10 December, a period of 15 games, the Daggers won only once, which put them bottom of the table. After this the team's luck improved slightly and they started to pick up some points, with draws against Burton Albion and Southend United and consecutive wins against Barnet and Gillingham. After a few more losses the Daggers finished the season terrifically and from 17 March until 5 May good form saw them only lose 1 game from the final 10. They eventually finished the season in 19th place.

The 2012–2013 season did not start too well, the team drawing 4 draws losing 4 in their opening 8 games. The 9th game was better as the Daggers got their first win of the season, a 3–0 win against Wycombe Wanderers. Another troublesome season for the team ensued, and they were devastated when John Still, their manager of 9 years, left the club on 26 February 2013 to join Luton Town. Preceding this Wayne Burnett was made Caretaker Manager for the remaining games of the season. After another run of bad results, the club finished the season in 22nd place. Following the club's safety from relegation, on 2 May 2013, Wayne Burnett was appointed the manager on a permanent basis.

The start of the 2013–2014 season did not start well for Dagenham & Redbridge as they lost their opening league match 3–1 to Fleetwood Town and were knocked out in the first round of the League Cup as they lost 3–2 to Brentford. However, in their next league game, they defeated York City 2–0 with goals from Rhys Murphy and Brian Woodall. An inconsistent season followed, the club spending the majority of the year in mid-table. In March, Zavon Hines was ruled out of the remainder of the campaign, due to an anterior cruciate ligament injury. On the final day of the season, the Daggers celebrated a 3–2 victory over Cheltenham. A 3–3 draw between Portsmouth and Plymouth Argyle allowed Dagenham & Redbridge to finish in a more respectable ninth place.

After the 2013–14 season ended, manager Wayne Burnett decided against renewing a number of players' contracts, and several of them, including Hines and former Ghana international Chris Dickson, were released. Hines would later sign a new two-year deal with the club.

The 2014–2015 season began badly for the Daggers with a 3–0 defeat to Morecambe on opening day, followed by a defeat to Brentford in the Football League Cup a few days later. The match ended 6–6 after extra time, with the Brentford winning in the subsequent penalty shootout. The League Cup paid tribute to the historic match by removing the goal nets at Victoria Road, putting them on display at the National Football Museum.

In the 2015/16 season, the team of coach Wayne Burnett only booked his first victory on the sixth match day. Three points were taken in the away match at Northampton Town. However, this was not a precursor to improving results. Until the end of the calendar year, the Daggers managed to take full advantage once more and spent the entire season in the relegation zone. Burnett was fired on 21 December 2015. Two days earlier, Bristol Rovers lost 3-0, making Dagenham sit in last place. On New Year's Eve it was announced that John Still returned to the club as head coach. Two days later, they beat Exeter City 2-1. However, after this, many defeats followed and Still was unable to save Dagenham & Redbridge from relegation in his third period. After a 3-2 defeat visiting Leyton Orient on matchday 42, relegation from the League Two was a fact.

Failed match-fixing plot

Following newspaper reports, an investigation  launched by the National Crime Agency jailed two players and businessman, Krishna Ganeshan, Chann Sankaran and Michael Boateng, a Whitehawk player, for match-fixing. Moses Swaibu was similarly charged in January 2014.
They were convicted of conspiracy to commit bribery for a failed plot to fix a game between AFC Wimbledon and Dagenham & Redbridge on 26 November. It is believed that the case may have been part of a wider Singaporean match-fixing syndicate which Europol and other investigations uncovered.

Relegation to the National League
Following a nine-year period in the Football League the Daggers were relegated after a defeat against local rivals Leyton Orient. They were among the promotion favourites in their first season back in the National League and ended the season in fourth place. After losing their playoff semi-final to Forest Green Rovers, Dagenham  participated in the National League the following season. The 2017-18 National League season started positively, but after the club was plagued by a financial crisis midway through the season the Daggers finished the campaign in eleventh place. The financial crisis was resolved early in the 2018-19 National League season.

Current squad

First-team squad

Out on loan

Current staff
Updated 	24 February 2023

Managers
Dagenham & Redbridge have had nine different managers since their formation in 1992.

Stadium

Club records history

League history

Records

Record victory;
Football Conference – 8–1 vs Woking, 19 April 1994
Football League – 6–0 vs Chester City, 9 August 2008; 6–0 vs Morecambe, 16 May 2010

Record defeat;
Football Conference – 0–9 vs Hereford United, 27 February 2004
Football League – 5–0 vs Peterborough United, 7 May 2011; 5–0 vs Cheltenham Town, 18 February 2012

Record attendance: 5,949 vs Ipswich Town, FA Cup third round, 5 January 2001

Record League attendance: 4,791 vs Shrewsbury Town, Football League Two, 2 May 2009

Record transfer fee received: Dwight Gayle to Peterborough United, £700,000 (2013).

Record appearance holder: Tony Roberts, 507 appearances over 10 years

Record goalscorer: Danny Shipp, 105 goals over nine years

FA Cup: 4th round 2002–03; lost to Norwich City 0–1 (reached the 3rd round 3 times while a Non-League Club)

Other records
Tony Roberts was the first goalkeeper in the history of the FA Cup to have scored a goal from open play. He netted against Basingstoke Town in October 2001, it was a fourth qualifying round.
First fully capped international whilst playing for Dagenham & Redbridge was Jon Nurse who was capped for Barbados against Dominica in 2008.
The highest ever scoreline in the first leg of a play off game is now held by Dagenham & Redbridge, they defeated Morecambe 6–0 on 16 May 2010, although they could not build on this afterwards with a 2–1 defeat in the second leg.
The highest scoring penalty shootout in professional football history, with Dagenham & Redbridge defeating Leyton Orient in the 2nd round of the Football League Trophy 14–13, 27 penalties in total, on 8 September 2011. This was later equalled, but not bettered, by Liverpool who beat Middlesbrough in a League Cup penalty shoot out by the same score in September 2014.
The joint highest aggregate score in a League Cup match: 12 – On 12 August 2014, Dagenham & Redbridge drew 6–6 after extra time at home with Brentford in the first round of the League Cup. They went on to lose 4–2 on penalties.

Honours

League 
League Two (Tier 4)
Play-off winners: 2009–10
Conference (Tier 5)
Winners (1): 2006–07
Isthmian League Premier (Tier 6)
Winners (1): 1999–2000

Cups 
FA Trophy
 Runners-up: 1996–97
Essex Senior Cup
Winners (2): 1997–98, 2000–01
 Runners-up: 2001–02

See also
Football in London

References

External links

 

 
Sport in the London Borough of Barking and Dagenham
Football clubs in England
Former English Football League clubs
Sport in the London Borough of Redbridge
Association football clubs established in 1992
Football clubs in London
1992 establishments in England
Isthmian League
National League (English football) clubs
Dagenham